Thomas Winter Sheppard (4 March 1873 – 7 June 1954) was an English first-class cricketer in the early twentieth century. He made only two first-class appearances, one for each of Hampshire and Worcestershire.

Military career
Shepard joined the Liverpool Regiment as Second lieutenant on 25 February 1893. He was promoted to lieutenant on 20 September 1895, and to captain on 21 March 1900, when he was in South Africa to serve in the Second Boer War. He served with Mounted infantry from March 1900 until 1902, returning home after the end of the war in June that year. He was back in a regular commission in his regiment from September 1902, but later  transferred to the 12th Provisional Battalion.

Cricket
His debut came for Hampshire against Yorkshire at Hull in August 1905; he scored 17 in a match in which play was possible on only one of the three scheduled days.
Nearly four years later, in June 1909, Sheppard turned out for Worcestershire against Oxford University at The University Parks; here he made 22 and 14.

He changed his name to Thomas Winter Sheppard-Graham in 1919. He was the great-uncle of England Test batsman and Church of England bishop David Sheppard.

References

External links
Statistical summary from CricketArchive

1873 births
1954 deaths
English cricketers
Hampshire cricketers
Worcestershire cricketers